Jonathan Taylor Alley is an American rugby league footballer and coach for the Central Florida Warriors. He was selected to represent the United States in the 2017 Rugby League World Cup.

Playing career
He has played for the Jacksonville Axemen and was part of their 2012 premiership winning side and also for the UNF (University of North Florida) Deadbirds rugby union team. He has played for the Narooma Devils in the Group 16 Rugby League on the New South Wales South Coast. He scored 2 tries for the United States in their 36-18 victory over Canada in October 2017.

He was selected to represent the United States in the 2017 Rugby League World Cup.

References

External links
Central Florida Warriors profile
2017 RLWC profile

Year of birth missing (living people)
Living people
American rugby league players
Central Florida Warriors coaches
Central Florida Warriors players
Jacksonville Axemen players
Rugby league second-rows
Alley
University of North Florida alumni